Bubalus is a genus of Asiatic bovines that was proposed by Charles Hamilton Smith in 1827. Bubalus and Syncerus form the subtribe Bubalina, the true buffaloes.

The International Code of Zoological Nomenclature and classification of domestic animals as species, subspecies, races or breeds has been discussed controversially for many years and was inconsistent between authors. Assessors of the Food and Agriculture Organization consider domestic water buffalo populations as breeds.

Bubalus species comprise the domestic water buffalo (B. bubalis), the wild water buffalo (B. arnee), the tamaraw (B. mindorensis), the lowland anoa (B. depressicornis), and the mountain anoa (B. quarlesi). The latter two anoa species were proposed to form a subgenus within Bubalus.

Characteristics 

Smith described Bubalus as low in proportion to the bulk with very solid limbs, a small dewlap and a long, slender tail; the head is large with a strong convex-shaped narrow forehead, large eyes and funnel-shaped ears; horns are lying flat or bending laterally with a certain direction to the rear; the female udder has four mammae. Lydekker added that the line of back is nearly straight with 13 pairs of ribs; the tail is tufted and reaching about to the hocks; the horns are more or less markedly triangular for the greater part of their length and situated low down on the skull; the muzzle is broad, and the hair sparse in adults.

Species
This genus comprises the following living species:

Valid names
The 2013 checklist of the Catalogue of Life lists as "accepted" five species binomina in the genus Bubalus:
 Bubalus bubalis Linnaeus, 1758
 Bubalus depressicornis Smith, 1827
 Bubalus mephistopheles Hopwood, 1925
 Bubalus mindorensis Heude, 1888
 Bubalus quarlesi Ouwens, 1910
Bubalus arnee is not listed here.

The Integrated Taxonomic Information System lists the same five species binomina as valid; it also lists as valid six subspecies of Bubalus bubalis:
 Bubalus bubalis arnee Kerr, 1792
 Bubalus bubalis bubalis Linnaeus, 1758
 Bubalus bubalis fulvus Blanford, 1891
 Bubalus bubalis kerabau Fitzinger, 1860
 Bubalus bubalis migona Deraniyagala, 1952
 Bubalus bubalis theerapati Groves, 1996

Fossil species 
 
The following extinct fossil species have been described:

Bubalus brevicornis - Young, 1936
Bubalus cebuensis (Cebu tamaraw) - Croft, Heaney, Flynn and Bautista, 2006
Bubalus fudi - Guo, 2008 - (possibly a subspecies of Bubalus wansijocki)
Bubalus grovesi - Rozzi, 2017<ref>{{cite journal | last1 = Rozzi | first1 = Roberto | year = 2017 | title = A new extinct dwarfed buffalo from Sulawesi and the evolution of the subgenus Anoa: An interdisciplinary perspective | journal = Quaternary Science Reviews | volume = 157 | pages = 188–205 | doi=10.1016/j.quascirev.2016.12.011| bibcode = 2017QSRv..157..188R | doi-access = free }}</ref>Bubalus mephistopheles (Short-horned water buffalo) - Hopwood, 1925Bubalus murrensis (European water buffalo) - Berckhemer, 1927Bubalus palaeokerabau (Long-horned Javan water buffalo) - E. Dubois, 1908Bubalus platyceros - Lydekker, 1877Bubalus teilhardi - Young, 1932Bubalus wansijocki - Chardin, 1928Bubalus youngi'' - Chow and Hsu, 1957

See also
 List of water buffalo breeds

References

Bovines
Herbivorous mammals
Mammal genera
Taxa named by Charles Hamilton Smith